Tashi Dorji (born 3 October 1981) is a Bhutanese politician who is the current Chairman of the National Council of Bhutan. He has been a member of the National Council of Bhutan since May 2018. Previously, he was a member of the National Council of Bhutan from 2013 to 2018. He is the youngest Chairman of the Upper house of Bhutan.

He was elected as Chairman of the National Council of Bhutan. He received 11 votes out of total 25 votes cast and defeated Lhatu and Nima.

Controversy 
While deliberating the Pay Structure Reform Bill 2022 on 29th November 2022, Tashi Dorji ordered Gasa MP Dorji Khandu to leave the hall for comparing the Housing Allowance for low-income civil servants and  Communication Allowance for high-income civil servants. Gasa MP was subsequently suspended from attending the NC assembly until the adoption of the Pay Structure Reform Bill 2022  which attracted public criticism.

References 

Members of the National Council (Bhutan)
1981 births
Living people